The Equinox (subtitle: The Review of Scientific Illuminism) was a periodical that served as the official organ of the A∴A∴, a magical order founded by Aleister Crowley (although material is often of import to its sister organization, Ordo Templi Orientis). Begun in 1909, it mainly featured articles about occultism and magick, while several issues also contained poetry, fiction, plays, artwork, and biographies. The last issue was published in 1998.

Publication history

The Equinox appeared semiannually from the years 1909 through 1913. Volume II was never published, and vol. III:1 was the last in the regular serialized publications. After that, editions of the Equinox were published irregularly by various organizations and are best known by their book titles. All issues after III:5 were edited and released after Crowley's death in 1947.

 Vol. I, #1: Spring 1909. Simpkin, Marshall, Hamilton, Kent & Co., Ltd.
 Vol. I, #2: Autumn 1909. Simpkin, Marshall, Hamilton, Kent & Co., Ltd.
 Vol. I, #3: Spring 1910. Simpkin, Marshall, Hamilton, Kent & Co., Ltd.
 Vol. I, #4: Autumn 1910. Privately published, London.
 Vol. I, #5: Spring 1911. Privately published, London.
 Vol. I, #6: Autumn 1911. Wieland & Co.
 Vol. I, #7: Spring 1912. Wieland & Co.
 Vol. I, #8: Autumn 1912. Wieland & Co.
 Vol. I, #9: Spring 1913. Wieland & Co.
 Vol. I, #10: Autumn 1913. Wieland & Co.
 Vol. II: not issued
 Vol. III, #1: Spring 1919. Universal Publishing Co, Detroit MI
 Vol. III, #2: Jesus, Liber 888, and Other Papers—not issued
 Vol. III, #3: The Equinox of the Gods. 1936. London, O.T.O.
 Vol. III, #4: Eight Lectures on Yoga. 1939. London, O.T.O.
 Vol. III, #5: The Book of Thoth. 1944. London, O.T.O.
 Vol. III, #6: Liber Aleph. 1961. Thelema Publishing Co.
 Vol. III, #7: Shih Yi. 1971. Thelema Publishing Co.
 Vol. III, #8: The Tao Teh King. 1975. Weiser.
 Vol. III, #9: The Holy Books of Thelema. 1983. Weiser.
 Vol. III, #10: 1986. Weiser.
 Vol. IV, #1: Commentaries on the Holy Books and Other Papers. 1996. Weiser.
 Vol. IV, #2: The Vision and the Voice with Commentary and Other Papers. 1998. Weiser.

Contents of The Equinox

Volume I

Number 1
Editorial
An Account of A∴ A∴
Liber Librae [The Book of the Balance]
Liber Exercitiorum
The Wizard Way. By Aleister Crowley
The Magic Glasses. By Frank Harris
The Chymical Jousting of Brother Perardua
The Lonely Bride. By Victor B. Neuburg
At the Fork of the Roads
The Magician
The Soldier and the Hunchback: ! And ? By Aleister Crowley
The Hermit
The Temple of Solomon the King (Book I)
The Herb Dangerous (Part I) : A Pharmaceutical Study. By  E. Whineray, M.P.S.
Endpages
Special Supplement: John St. John: the Record of the Magical Retirement of G. H. by Frater O∴ M∴

Number 2
Frontpages
Editorial
Liber O [vel Manus et Sagittae sub Figura VI]
The Herb Dangerous (Part II) : The Psychology of Hashish.  By Oliver Haddo
Reviews
The Garden of Janus. By Aleister Crowley
The Dream Circean. By Marital Nay
The Lost Shepherd. By Victor B. Neuburg
A Handbook of Geomancy
The Organ in King's Chapel, Cambridge, By G. H. S. Pinsent
A Note on Genesis
The Five Adorations. By Dost Achiha Khan
Illusion D'amoureux. By Francis Bendick
The Opium-Smoker
Postcards to Probationers. By Aleister Crowley
The Wild Ass. By Alys Cusack
The Sphinx at Gizeh. By Lord Dunsany
The Priestess of Panormita. By Elaine Carr
The Temple of Solomon the King (Book II)
Amongst the Mermaids. By Norman Roe
Ave Adonai. By Aleister Crowley
The Man-Cover. By George Raffalovich
Stewed Prunes and Prism: The Tennyson Centenary. By A. Quiller, Jr.
Stop Press Reviews

Number 3
Frontpages
Editorial
Liber XIII [vel Graduum Montis Abiegni: A Syllabus of the Steps Upon the Path]
AHA! By Aleister Crowley
The Herb Dangerous (Part III) : The Poem of Hashish. By Charles Baudelaire (Translated By Aleister Crowley)
An Origin. By Victor B. Neuburg
The Soul-Hunter
Madeleine. By Arthur F. Grimble
The Temple of Solomon the King (Book II "Continued")
The Coming of Apollo. By Victor B. Neuburg
The Brighton Mystery. By George Raffalovich
Reviews
The Shadowy Dill-Waters. By A. Quiller, Jr.
Stop Press Reviews and Endpages
Special Supplement: Liber DCCCCLXIII. the Treasure-House of Images

Number 4
Frontpages
Editorial
Liber III [vel Jugorum]
Liber A [vel Armorum sub Figura CCCCXII]
I.NST N.ATTURAE R.EGINA I.SIS. By Omnia Vincam
Reviews
My Lady of the Breeches. By George Raffalovich
Reviews
At Bordj-An-Nus. By Hilda Norfolk
ΑΙΝΟΖΙΔΟΖ.  By Aleister Crowley
The Temple of Solomon the King. IV
Pan to Artemis. By Aleister Crowley
The Interpreter. By Perdurabo
The Daughter of the Horseleech. By Ethel Ramsay
The Dreamer
Mr. Todd. A Morality. By the Author of "Rosa Mundi" (William Butler Yeats)
The Gnome. By Victor B. Neuburg
Review
The Herb Dangerous. Part IV: the Hasheesh Eater
The Agnostic
The Mantra-Yogi
The Buddhist
The Violinist. By Francis Bendick
EHE! By George Raffalovich
Half-Hours with Famous Mahatmas. No. I. By Sam Hardy
The Thief-Taker. By Aleister Crowley
Review
The Eyes of St. Ljubov. By J. F. C. Fuller And George  Raffalovich
Midsummer Eve. By Ethel Archer
The Poetical Memory
Adela
The Three Worms. By Edward Storer
The Felon Flower. By Ethel Archer
The Big Stick
Glaziers' Houses
In the Temple. By Victor B. Neuburg
Endpages
Special Supplement: the High History of Sir Palamedes the Saracen Knight and of his Following the Questing Beast

Number 5
Frontpages
Editorial
Liber HHH [sub figura CCCXLI]
The Blind Prophet. By Aleister Crowley
The Training of the Mind. By Ananda Metteya
The Sabbath. By Ethel Ramsay
The Temple of Solomon the King
A Nocturne. By Victor B. Neuburg
The Vixen. By Francis Bendick
The Pilgrim. By Aleister Crowley
My Crapulous Contemporaries, No. IV.—Wisdom While You Waite. By Aleister Crowley
X-Rays on Ex-Probationers. By Perdurabo
The Vampire. By Ethel Archer
The Big Stick
Correspondence
Stop Press Reviews
Special Supplement: Liber CCCCXVIII (XXX Aerum) [vel Saecvli sub figura CCCCXVIII, Being of the Angels of the 30 Aethyrs, the Vision and the Voice]

Number 6
Frontpages
Editorial
Liber X [Liber Porta Lucis]
Liber XVI [Liber Turris vel Domus Dei]
Liber XC [Liber Tzaddi vel Hamus Hermeticus]
Liber CLVI [Liber Cheth vel Vallum Abiegni]
Liber CC [Liber Resh vel Helios]
Liber CCCLXX [Liber A'Ash vel Capricorni Pneumatici]
Three Poems For Jane Cheron. By Aleister Crowley
Circe. By Ethel Archer
The Electric Silence
Song
The Scorpion. By Aleister Crowley
The Earth. By Francis Bendick
Sleep. By Ethel Archer
The Ordeal of Ida Pendragon. By Martial Nay
The Autumn Woods. By Victor Neuburg
The Dangers of Mysticism
The Big Stick. By John Yarker, E. Whineray, Aleister  Crowley, Etc.
Endpages
Special Supplement: The Rites of Eleusis

Number 7
Frontpages
Editorial
Liber I [vel Magi]
Liber XI [Liber Nu]
Liber LXIV [Liber Israfel]
Liber LXVI [Liber Stellae Rubeae]
Liber CLXXV [Astarte vel Liber Berylli]
Liber CCVI [Liber Ru vel Spiritus]
Liber CCXXXI
Liber CD [Liber Tau vel Kabbalae Trium Literarum]
Liber CDLXXIV [Liber os Asbysmi vel Daath]
Liber DLV [Liber Had]
Liber DCCCXXXI [Liber Tau]
Liber CMXIII [Liber ThIShARB viae Memoriae]
Adonis. By Aleister Crowley
The Ghouls. By Aleister Crowley
The Four Winds. By Aleister Crowley
Independence. By Aleister Crowley
Showstorm. By Aleister Crowley
A Brief Abstract of the Symbolic Representation of the Universe Derived by Doctor John Dee through the Skrying of Sir Edward Kelley. By Aleister Crowley
Apollo Bestows the Violin. By Aleister Crowley
Diana of the Inlet. By Katharine Susannah Prichard
Silence. By Ethel Archer
Memory of Love. By Meredith Starr
Across the Gulf. By Aleister Crowley
The Temple of Solomon the King ("Continued")
My Crapulous Contemporaries. No. V., the Bismarck of Battersea. By A. Quiller, Jun. (Aleister Crowley)
Arthur in the Area Again. By Aleister Crowley
The Big Stick. Reviews By Aleister Crowley and John Yarker
A Birthday. By Aleister Crowley

Number 8
Frontpages
Editorial
θέλημα : a Tone-Testament By Leila Waddell
Three Poems. By Victor B. Neuburg
The Temple of Solomon the King (continued)
His Secret Sin
Long Odds
Doctor Bob. A Sketch By Mary D'este and Aleister Crowley
The Woodcutter
La Foire. By Barbey De Rochechouart
Professor Zircon
A Brief Abstract of the Symbolic Representation of the Universe,  Derived by Doctor John Dee through the Skrying of Sir Edward Kelly. Part II. The Forty-Eight Calls
Stepney
The Tell-Tale Heart. Adapted from the Story of E. A. Poe. By Aleister Crowley
Sorites
A Description of the Cards of the Tarot, with their Attributions; Including a Method of Divination by their Use
On-On-"Poet"
Elder Eel
The Spadger
To Persis
Waite's Wet or the Backslider's Return
My Crapulous Contemporaries. No. VI. An Obituary
The New Evelyn Hope
Reviews
Special Supplement: Sepher Sephiroth

Number 9
Frontpages
Editorial
The Temple of Solomon the King ("Continued")
Lines to a Young Lady Violinist on Her Playing in a Green Dress Designed By the Author
Energized Enthusiasm
The "Titanic"
A Literatooralooral Treasure-Trove
Threnody
Dischmatal by Night. By Arthur Grimble
A Quack Painter
At Sea
Cancer?
Dumb!
The Vitriol-Thrower
The Fairy Fiddler. By Ethel Archer
An Evocation of Bartzabel the Spirit of Mars
The Testament of Magdalen Blair
Ercildoune. By Aleister Crowley
Athanasius Contra Decanum
My Crapulous Contemporaries. No. VII. A Galahad in Gomorrah
How I Became a Famous Mountaineer. By Percy W. Newlands, P.R.A.S., P.R.B.S., P.R.C.S., P.R.Y.S., P.R.Z.S., Etc., Etc.
The Tango: A Sketch. By Mary D'este and Aleister Crowley
The Big Stick
Reviews

Number 10
Frontpages
Editorial
Liber L. Vel Legis The Book of the Law
Liber ΒΑΤΡΑΧΟΦΕΝΟΒΟΟΚΟΣΜΟΜΑΧΙΑ Svb Figvra DXXXVI
A Syllabus of the Οfficial Ιnstructions of A∴ A∴
The Ship
As in a Glass, Darkly. By Arthur Grimble.
Two Fragments of Ritual
The Disciples
The Temple of Solomon the King ("Concluded)"
Rosa Ignota. By Victor B. Neuburg
The Game of Crowley
Boo to Buddha
Crowley Pool
Hymn to Satan
A Ballad of Bedlam. By Ethel Archer.
Dead Weight
The Big Stick
Colophon—To Laylah Eight-And-Twenty
Index to Volume I
Endpages
Special Supplement: The Key of the Mysteries

Volume II

Volume II was never published. A common misconception is that the reason is because of the A.'.A.'. period of Silence. However this is not the case as Aleister Crowley later published Volume III No.3 in 1936 - during an A.'.A.'. period of Silence. It is not known why Volume II was not published..

Volume III

Number 1, also called the Blue Equinox

Hymn to Pan
Editorial
Præmonstrance of A∴A∴
Curriculum of A∴A∴
Liber II [The Message of the Master Therion]
The Tent
Liber DCCCXXXVII [The Law of Liberty]
Liber LXI [vel Causae A∴A∴]
A Psalm
Liber LXV [Liber Cordis Cincti Serpente]
Liber CL [De Lege Libellum]
A Psalm
Liber CLXV [A Master of the Temple]
Liber CCC [Khabs am Pekht]
Stepping Out of the Old Aeon into the New
The Seven Fold Sacrament
Liber LII [Manifesto of the O.T.O.]
Liber CI [An Open Letter to Those Who May Wish to Join the Order]
Liber CLXI [Concerning the Law of Thelema]
Liber CXCIV [An Intimation with Reference to the Constitution of the Order]
Liber XV The Gnostic Mass
Nekam Adonai!
A La Loge
The Tank
Special Supplement: Liber LXXI [The Voice of the Silence: The Two Paths, The Seven Portals]

Numbers 2–10
 #2: The Gospel According to St. Bernard Shaw (allegedly, never published)
 #3: The Equinox of the Gods
 #4: Eight Lectures on Yoga
 #5: The Book of Thoth
 #6: Liber Aleph
 #7: Shih Yi (I Ching)
 #8: Tao Teh Ching
 #9: The Holy Books of Thelema
 #10 The Review of Scientific Illuminism, the official Organ of the O.T.O.

Volume IV

Number 1, Commentaries on the Holy Books and Other Papers
Occultism
One Star in Sight
Liber XXXIII. An Account of A∴A∴
Liber Collegii Sancti sub figura CLXXXV (Being the Tasks of the Grades and Their Oaths)
Liber Vesta vel פרכת sub figura DCC (Book of the Robes of the Order)
Liber DCLXXI vel Pyramidos: A Ritual of Self-Initiation Based Upon the Formula of the Neophyte
Four Paintings by J.F.C. Fuller
Liber VIII (The Ritual Proper for the Invocation of Augoeides)
Liber LXV with Commentary (Liber Cordis Cincti Serpente)
Liber LXXI, the Voice of the Silence with Commentary
Shorter Commentaries to the Holy Books

Number 2, The Vision and the Voice : With Commentary and Other Papers
Liber CDXVIII. The Vision and the Voice with Commentary
Liber CCCXXV. The Bartzabel Working
Liber LX. The Ab-ul-Diz Working
Liber CDXV. Opus Lutetianum, The Paris Working
Appendix I: Algerian Diary, 1909
Appendix II: Diary Fragment, 1910

Motta Equinox
Published long after Crowley's death, a series entitled The Equinox, Volume V was released by Marcelo Motta and his organization, Thelema Publishing Co.

 Vol. V, No. 1: The Commentaries to Liber AL vel Legis (1975)
 Vol. V, No. 2: Liber LXV and comments and writings by Marcelos Motta (1979)
 Vol. V, No. 3: The Chinese Texts of Magick and Mysticism (1980)
 Vol. V, No. 4: Sex and Religion (1981)
 Vol. VII, No. 1: The Red Equinox (1992)

See also
 Libri of Aleister Crowley
 List of works by Aleister Crowley
 The New Equinox

References

External links
Scans from The Equinox
The Equinox online

Thelemite texts
Western esoteric magazines